Irreligion in the United Kingdom is more prevalent than in some of Europe, with about 8% indicating they are atheistic in 2018. A third of Anglicans polled in a 2013 survey doubted the existence of God, while 15% of those with no religion believed in some higher power, and deemed themselves "spiritual" or even "religious."

1700–1850
Organised activism for irreligion in the United Kingdom derived its roots from the legacy of British nonconformists. The South Place Religious Society, which would later become associated with the Ethical movement, was founded in 1793 as an organisation of Philadelphians or Universalists.

In 1811 The Necessity of Atheism was published by a young Oxford student, Percy Bysshe Shelley. It was one of the first printed, open avowals of irreligion in England.

The Oracle of Reason, the first avowedly-atheist periodical publication in British history, was published from 1841 to 1843 by Charles Southwell. It suffered from numerous imprisonments of its staff, including Southwell, George Holyoake and Thomas Paterson, for missives deemed "blasphemous" by the authorities (Holyoake was the last person in Britain convicted of blasphemy in a public lecture). Holyoake took to publishing The Movement (1842–1845) following his six-month sentence, which later became The Reasoner (1845–1860) and shifted to a larger focus on social issues facing the British working class, increasing the publication's readership. It was during this time that Holyoake developed his idea for the replacement of Christianity with an ethical system based upon science and reason, terming his proposal "secularism".

1850–1900

George Holyoake's coining of the word secularism in 1851 offered the English-speaking world the clarification of the nascent movement for separation of religion and state. The National Secular Society, founded in 1866 by politician Charles Bradlaugh, spearheaded the advocacy for freeing citizens from absolute government requirements involving religious observances; the Leicester Secular Society was founded in 1851. Bradlaugh's 1880 election to Parliament brought on a decade-long dispute over the demanded right to affirm declarations of office rather than swear oaths, as he was denied his seat for five years by a ruling that he had no right to affirm and resolutions preventing him from swearing an oath. When Bradlaugh was ultimately admitted in 1886, he took up the issue and saw the Oaths Act 1888 passed, which confirmed the right to optionally affirm declarations for inaugurations to office and offering testimony to government bodies.

In 1881, The Freethinker began circulation as Britain's longest-running humanist periodical. In 1896, the Union of Ethical Societies was formed in the United Kingdom by American Stanton Coit as a union of pre-existing British Ethical movement societies; this group would later become known as the Ethical Union and the British Humanist Association. In 1899, the Rational Press Association was formed by a group of free-thinkers including Charles Albert Watts and George Holyoake.

Meanwhile, the South Place Religious Society became further aligned with organised secularist advocacy during the tenure of Moncure D. Conway as minister of the congregation; Conway, an American Unitarian minister who served from 1864 to 1885 and 1892–1897, moved the congregation further away from doctrinal Unitarianism, and spent the break in his tenure (during which Stanton Coit served in his stead) writing a biography of American revolutionary ideologue Thomas Paine. In 1888, the South Place Religious Society became the South Place Ethical Society, now known as the Conway Hall Ethical Society.

20th century
 
The 1960s were a significant time for irreligion, as the Ethical Union rebranded as the British Humanist Association, which went on to co-found the International Humanist and Ethical Union and create a symbol for humanism, the Happy Human. Broadcasters such as Margaret K. Knight sensationalised Britain with open advocacy of non-religious values and secular education. Senior figures in the British humanist movement went out to take on leading roles in institutions such as UNESCO, the World Health Organization, and the Food and Agriculture Organization.
 
John William Gott, a working man of Bradford, West Yorkshire, attacked religion, especially Christianity, seeing it as reducing the opportunity for a socialist revolution. His lectures on rationalism and scepticism, and anti-Christian pamphlets, saw him jailed for blasphemy in 1911. Liberal Prime Minister H. H. Asquith was one of a group of Members of Parliament who proposed an ultimately unsuccessful piece of legislation to abolish blasphemy offences. Gott was jailed again ten years later for a pamphlet showing Jesus as a clown, and died in 1922 soon after his nine-month sentence which included hard labour despite his worsening physical condition. There was a public backlash against his sentence.

Gott was the last Briton jailed for blasphemy, but the offence remained a technical crime through common law until being abolished in the Criminal Justice and Immigration Act 2008.

Evolutionary biologist Richard Dawkins, who first came to prominence in 1976 following the release of The Selfish Gene, increasingly figured in British irreligion with the release of his 1986 work The Blind Watchmaker, in which he argued in favour of evolutionary natural selection as opposed to intelligent design and creationism.

21st century

In the 21st century, New Atheism became a popular topic of debate, support and critique in the United Kingdom. Dawkins' 2006 book The God Delusion and Christopher Hitchens' 2007 book God Is Not Great were considered emblematic works of the era among British authors, and Dawkins advocated for the Brights movement. The Atheist Bus Campaign was inaugurated during this time, in which advertisements on double-decker buses were purchased by the British Humanist Association in order to advocate non-belief in the supernatural; the campaign caused controversy and complaints to authorities, but soon spread to other countries and continents, taking root in the United States as a variety of atheist billboard campaigns. A 2009 survey of 1,000 teenagers aged 13 to 18 reports that two-thirds of British teenagers do not believe in God.

The rise in irreligion was confirmed in the UK's 2011 census, which saw irreligion rise from 7.7 million in 2001 to 14.1 million, a rise of 10.3 percentage points. The local authority in England with the highest level of irreligion was Norwich, the county town of Norfolk, where the level was 42.5%. Religion has the least influence on youth. According to the 2011 census, 25% of England has no religion, 7% of Northern Ireland, one third in Scotland and one-third of Wales. In 2015, over 110 Parliamentarians in the UK are members of the All-Party Parliamentary Humanist Group, which means the non-religious have substantial representation among MPs and Lords.

According to YouGov, Christianity is perceived to be on the decline. Mori Polls have shown that British Christians support a secular state. Britons are amongst the most skeptical about religion.

Statistics from the Office of National Statistics published in 2019 showed that the number of non-religious people in Britain has increased by 46% since 2011 (up to a total of 39% of the population), with over 8 million more people declaring that they do not belong to any religious group. As well as this, the figures also show a 14% decline (from 59.3% to 51%) in the number of people identifying as Christian.

Humanists UK is the most prominent organisation espousing irreligion in the United Kingdom.

See also
Disestablishmentarianism
Religion in the United Kingdom

References

 

 
Religious demographics